Hermes Bautista (born February 7, 1986) is a Filipino-American actor currently on ABS-CBN. He was a housemate on Pinoy Big Brother: Double Up.

Personal life
Hermes Eugene David Bautista was born in San Diego, California. His family moved back to Pampanga when he was two years old. He graduated from Far Eastern University with a degree in Nursing. After finishing his studies, his family returned to the US. He was working as a nursing assistant in California prior to joining PBB.

Filmography

Television

Film

Theatre
 2011-2012: Romeo and Juliet - Prince Escalo

Awards
 24th PMPC Star Awards for Television "Best New Male TV Personality" (Your Song: Isla) - (Nominated)

Notes

See also 
 Mark Luz
 Renzie Ongkiko

References

External links

Hermes Bautista's Twitter
Hermes Bautista's Official Fanpage on Facebook

Filipino male television actors
Male actors from San Diego
American expatriate male actors
American male actors of Filipino descent
Male actors from Pampanga
1986 births
Living people
Far Eastern University alumni
Pinoy Big Brother contestants
Star Magic
Filipino male film actors